Nakha is a village in Banmauk Township, Katha District, in the Sagaing Region of northern-central Burma.

References

External links
 Maplandia World Gazetteer

Populated places in Katha District
Banmauk Township